Frederick Ferdinand, Hereditary Prince of Denmark (22 November 1792 – 29 June 1863) was grandson of King Frederick V and heir presumptive to the throne from 1848 until his death. Had he lived five months longer, he would have outlived his nephew, King Frederick VII, and become King of Denmark.

Early life

Prince Ferdinand was born at Christiansborg Palace in Copenhagen on 22 November 1792 as the youngest child of Frederick, Hereditary Prince of Denmark and Norway and Sophie Frederikke of Mecklenburg, thus being a grandson of late King Frederick V of Denmark and Norway.

His uncle King Christian VII being mentally unstable, his father had acted as regent after the fall of Johann Friedrich Struensee in 1772. But after the coup of 1784, when the king's son Crown Prince Frederick took power and regency, Hereditary Prince Frederick had been without influence at the court. However, Crown Prince Frederick being without male heirs, Hereditary Prince Frederick and his sons were in the immediate line of succession to the throne.

When Christiansborg Palace was destroyed by fire in 1794, the young Prince and his family moved to Amalienborg Palace where he was brought up, spending the summers at Sorgenfri Palace.

Marriage

Prince Ferdinand married at Frederiksberg Palace on 1 August 1829 his first cousin once removed, Princess Caroline of Denmark (1793–1881). She was the eldest daughter of the above-mentioned sonless Crown Prince Frederick, now King Frederick VI of Denmark. When Frederick VI died in 1839, because of the Salic Law Caroline did not succeed to the throne, which was inherited by the closest male relative, Ferdinand's elder brother Prince Christian Frederick.

Later life

The number of male members of the Royal House was so low in those decades that Ferdinand himself was always very close to the succession. At the death of his brother Christian VIII in 1848, the aged Ferdinand became heir presumptive.

Ferdinand died childless, which was one of the reasons why the main branch of the Danish Royal House soon became extinct, triggering the second war of Schleswig.

Ancestry

External links

 The Danish Monarchy
 http://runeberg.org/dbl/5/0127.html

1792 births
1863 deaths
Danish princes
Norwegian princes
House of Oldenburg in Denmark
Grand Commanders of the Order of the Dannebrog
Burials at Roskilde Cathedral
Non-inheriting heirs presumptive